Beletsky Uyezd (Белецкий уезд) was one of the subdivisions of the Bessarabia Governorate of the Russian Empire. It was situated in the northwestern part of the governorate. Its administrative centre was Bălți (Beltsy).

Demographics
At the time of the Russian Empire Census of 1897, Beletsky Uyezd had a population of 211,448. Of these, 66.3% spoke Romanian, 12.9% Yiddish, 11.4% Ukrainian, 6.7% Russian, 1.0% German, 0.7% Romani, 0.7% Polish, 0.1% Armenian, 0.1% Belarusian and 0.1% Greek as their native language.

References

 
Uezds of Bessarabia Governorate
Bessarabia Governorate